Francis Humphris Fraser  (1833–1911) was a politician in Wellington, New Zealand.

Early life
Fraser was born in London, England, in 1833. He spent his childhood in Edinburgh, where he studied at Watson's Hospital School before returning to London in 1847. Fraser then promptly left London bound for New Zealand. He arrived in Wellington on board the Wild Duck in 1864.

Political career

National politics

Fraser briefly represented the Te Aro electorate in Wellington in 1887 after winning a by-election, from 15 April to 15 July, when he was defeated. Later, he was a member of the New Zealand Legislative Council for one seven-year term from 1899 to 1906.

Local politics
Fraser won a seat on the Wellington City Council in 1888. During his tenure on the council he was the central figure of Wellington's temperance movement. He also served on the Wellington Harbour Board, District Charitable Aid Board, and Wellington Hospital Trustees Board. The latter of these he also held the position of chairman.

References

1833 births
1911 deaths
Members of the New Zealand House of Representatives
Members of the New Zealand Legislative Council
Wellington City Councillors
Wellington Harbour Board members
Wellington Hospital Board members
Unsuccessful candidates in the 1887 New Zealand general election
Unsuccessful candidates in the 1890 New Zealand general election
Unsuccessful candidates in the 1893 New Zealand general election
Unsuccessful candidates in the 1896 New Zealand general election
Unsuccessful candidates in the 1884 New Zealand general election
New Zealand MPs for Wellington electorates
19th-century New Zealand politicians
Date of birth unknown